Viktor Spasov (born 19 July 1959) is a retired pole vaulter, who represented the Soviet Union during his career. He set his personal best (5.70 metres) on 7 March 1982 at the European Indoor Championships in Milan, earning him the gold medal.

Achievements

References 
trackfield.brinkster

1959 births
Living people
Soviet male pole vaulters
Ukrainian male pole vaulters
Universiade medalists in athletics (track and field)
Universiade gold medalists for the Soviet Union
Medalists at the 1987 Summer Universiade